Danylo Kondrakov (born 19 January 1998) is a Ukrainian professional footballer who plays as a striker for Pirin Blagoevgrad.

Career
Kondrakov is a product of the FC Zorya Luhansk and FC Azovstal Mariupol youth systems. Due to the 2014 Russian aggression against Ukraine, he moved to Zaporizhia where lived his grandfather, who is a coach of a local women's basketball team. In 2015 Kondrakov trained with DYuSSh Metalurh but never signed a professional contract. Later he played for Metalurh U-19 Zaporizhia and Spartak-KPU in the Student League. In 2016 Kondrakov joined the reformed Metalurh Zaporizhia that restarted in amateurs and led by Illya Blyznyuk. He made his debut in professional football on 13 September 2016 in an away game against FC Real Pharma Odesa in the Second League.

During the winter break of the 2016–17 season, Oleh Lutkov invited Kondrakov to FC Skala Stryi, where he signed with the under-19 team.

He made his debut for FC Zirka Kropyvnytskyi against FC Shakhtar Donetsk on 23 September 2017 in the Ukrainian Premier League.

On 1 April 2019 Kondrakov signed with FC Rukh Vynnyky.

In January 2023, he joined First League club Pirin Blagoevgrad.

References

External links
 
 
 Даниил Кондраков - карьера. ua.tribuna.com

1998 births
Living people
Footballers from Luhansk
Ukrainian footballers
Ukrainian expatriate footballers
FC Metalurh Zaporizhzhia players
FC Skala Stryi (2004) players
FC Zirka Kropyvnytskyi players
FC Rukh Lviv players
FK Sūduva Marijampolė players
OFC Pirin Blagoevgrad players
Ukrainian Premier League players
Ukrainian First League players
Ukrainian Second League players
A Lyga players
Association football forwards
Expatriate footballers in Lithuania
Ukrainian expatriate sportspeople in Lithuania
Expatriate footballers in Bulgaria
Ukrainian expatriate sportspeople in Bulgaria